Americano Futebol Clube, commonly known as Americano, is a Brazilian football club based in Bacabal, Maranhão state.

History
The club was founded on November 15, 1978. Americano competed in the Campeonato Maranhense in 1993, 1996, 1998 to 2000, and in 2005.

Stadium
Americano Futebol Clube play their home games at Estádio José Luís Corrêa, nicknamed Correão. The stadium has a maximum capacity of 7,856 people.

References

Football clubs in Maranhão
Association football clubs established in 1978
1978 establishments in Brazil